is a Japanese film and television actress. She became a student in the theater troupe Tokyo Kandenchi in 2000, and made her film debut in 2002 with Takashi Miike's Shangri-La. She had her first starring role in Yuki Tanada's Moon and Cherry in 2004.

Filmography

Films
Shangri-La (2002)
Moon and Cherry (2004)
Josee, the Tiger and the Fish (2003)
All About My Dog (2005)
Yamiutsu shinzo (Heart, Beating in the Dark) (2005)
Memories of Matsuko (2006)
One Million Yen Girl (2008)
Fine, Totally Fine (2008)
Yuriko's Aroma (2010) as Yuriko
Heaven's Story (2010)
Patisserie Coin de rue (2011)
We Can't Change the World. But, We Wanna Build a School in Cambodia. (2011)
The Story of Yonosuke (2013) as Kyōko Kogure
Close-Knit (2017)
Asahinagu (2017)
Tornado Girl (2017)
Just Only Love (2019) as Sumire
My Girlfriend is a Serial Killer (2019)
Stolen Identity 2 (2020)
Masked Ward (2020)
My Name is Yours (2020)
Stigmatized Properties (2020)
Soiree (2020)
Riverside Mukolitta (2022)
Tsuyukusa (2022)
It's in the Woods (2022)
Ripples (2023) as Hitomi Ogasawara

Television
Vampire Heaven (2013)
Ashita, Mama ga Inai (2014)
Massan (2014)
Hana Moyu (2015)
Dr. Storks (2015)
Anone (2018)
Hanzawa Naoki (2020), Akiko Shirai
Old Jack and Rose (2021)
The 13 Lords of the Shogun (2022), Kame

Awards

References

External links
Official agency profile 

Japanese actresses
1980 births
Living people
Place of birth missing (living people)
Actors from Hyōgo Prefecture